Li Man-kuei (13 June 1907 – 20 October 1975) was a Chinese educator, dramatist and politician. She was among the first group of women elected to the Legislative Yuan in 1948 and has been described as the 'mother of modern Chinese drama'.

Biography
Born in 1907, Li was originally from Taishan in Guangdong province. After attending Zhenguang Middle School between 1921 and 1926, she majored in Chinese at Yenching University, graduating in 1930. She returned to Guangdong and taught Chinese at Pooi To Middle School until 1933, when she returned to Yenching University for graduate studies in Chinese and English. Between 1934 and 1936 she attended University of Michigan as a Barbour Scholar and earned a master's degree in English. During her time in Michigan she became the first foreign student to win the Hopwood Contest for Drama and Essay.  She was then employed by Library of Congress in Washington, D.C. compiling the Eminent Chinese of the Ch'ing Period. From 1937 to 1940 she worked at Columbia University, where she worked part-time in the East Asiatic Collections, edited Far Eastern Magazine (the publication of the Chinese Students Association of America) and specialised in writing plays and stories.

Returning to China in 1940, Li taught at several institutions, including Ginling College and Chengchi University. A prominent member of the Kuomintang,
she was a delegate to the  that drew up the constitution of the Republic of China. She was subsequently a candidate in Guangdong Province in the 1948 elections to the Legislative Yuan, in which she was elected to parliament. She relocated to Taiwan during the Chinese Civil War, where she was credited with reviving local theatre. She used her political influence to raise the profile of drama and funding for it, organised drama festivals and encouraged international cultural exchange. After returning from a visit to Europe and the United States in 1960, she established the Little Theatre Movement. The Little Theatre Movement introduced Western styles and modern performing arts to Taiwanese drama. She became dean of the drama departments at Chinese Culture University and Fu Hsing Kang College, and served as a juror of the Asia-Pacific Film Festival. She died in 1975.

References

1907 births
Yenching University alumni
Chinese schoolteachers
University of Michigan alumni
20th-century Chinese women writers
20th-century Chinese writers
Chinese dramatists and playwrights
Academic staff of Nanjing Normal University
Academic staff of the National Chengchi University
20th-century Chinese women politicians
Taiwanese people from Guangdong
Members of the 1st Legislative Yuan
Members of the 1st Legislative Yuan in Taiwan
Academic staff of the Chinese Culture University
Taiwanese dramatists and playwrights
1975 deaths
20th-century Taiwanese women politicians
Writers from Guangdong
Kuomintang Members of the Legislative Yuan in Taiwan
Chinese women dramatists and playwrights
People from Taishan, Guangdong
Chinese women educators
Taiwanese university and college faculty deans
20th-century Chinese educators
Women deans (academic)
Republic of China politicians from Guangdong
20th-century Taiwanese educators